Mitromorpha dorcas is a species of sea snail, a marine gastropod mollusk in the family Mitromorphidae.

Description
The length of the shell varies between 15 mm and 28 mm.

Distribution
This marine species occurs off the Philippines and Japan.

References

 Kuroda, T.; Habe, T.; Oyama, K. (1971). The Sea Shells of Sagami Bay. Maruzen Co., Tokyo. xix, 1–741 (Japanese text), 1–489 (English text), 1–51 (Index), pls 1–121
 Kosuge S. (1980) Description of new species of the genus Mitrella (Pyrenidae, Gastropoda). Bulletin of the Institute of Malacology, Tokyo 1(3): 46, pl. 9
 Cernohorsky, W.O. (1988b) Taxonomic notes on the Mitromorpha group of the family Turridae (Mollusca: Gastropoda: Borsoniinae). Records of the Auckland Institute and Museum, 25, 63–73

External links
 
 

dorcas
Gastropods described in 1971